The M8 Road is a road in the North-Western Province of Zambia. It connects Mutanda in Solwezi District with Zambezi Town via Mufumbwe, Manyinga & Kabompo.

Route
The M8 Road begins in Mutanda, Kalumbila District (30 kilometres south-south-west of Solwezi), at a t-junction with the T5 Road between Solwezi and Mwinilunga. The route begins by going southwards for 85 kilometres up to the settlement named Kawana in Kasempa District, where it meets the western terminus of the M18 Road from Lufwanyama and Kitwe in the Copperbelt Province.

After Kawana, the M8 begins to turn westwards and goes for 15 kilometres to meet a road, designated as the D181, which connects southwards to the town of Kasempa (45 kilometres away). After the Kasempa turn-off, the road continues westwards for 100 kilometres to the town of Mufumbwe in the district of the same name. From Mufumbwe, the road continues west-south-west for 93 kilometres, bypassing the West Lunga National Park, following the Kabompo River and crossing it, to the town of Manyinga in the district of the same name, where it meets a road (D286) going north to Mwinilunga.

The M8 Route continues south-west, still following the Kabompo River, for 30 kilometres to the town of Kabompo. From Kabompo, the road continues west-south-west for 67 kilometres to a place called Chilikita, where it meets a road going south to Watopa and Lukulu in the Western Province. From Chilikita, the road continues west-north-west for 72 kilometres to end at a 4-way-intersection with the D293 and RD296 in Zambezi Town. The D293 connects north to the town of Chavuma.

See also 
Roads in Zambia

References

Roads in Zambia
North-Western Province, Zambia